The UBC Department of Asian Studies at the University of British Columbia was established in 1961 and is one of the top Asian Studies departments in North America. The department's faculty and staff offices are located in the Asian Centre of the Vancouver campus.

History

Building
The Asian Centre building that houses the department consists of the roof and structural framework of the Sanyo Pavilion constructed for the 1970 World Exposition in Osaka, Japan.

About the logo

The UBC Department of Asian Studies logo is often mistaken to be a lotus flower, with its symbolization of purity, non-attachment and enlightenment in Buddhist tradition. The design (courtesy of Asian Studies MA student in Japanese Literature and Visual Culture and graphic designer Julien Butterlin) does indeed gesture in this direction, but the flower depicted is in fact that of Camellia sinensis or Thea sinensis, the tea plant whence many teas are derived. A genus of flowering plants in the family Theaceae, Camellia sinensis is used to harvest white tea, green tea, oolong, pu-erh tea and black tea.

Tea is the second-most widely consumed beverage in the world after water, and has played and continues to play such a central role in all Asian cultures that it was a natural choice to symbolize the diverse Asian languages, literature, cultures, histories, and religions represented in the Department of Asian Studies.

Degrees Programs

Undergraduate
Majors require 48 credits and minors require 30 credits of coursework within the department.

Major and minor in Asian Area Studies
Major and minor in Asian Language and Culture
The major includes a specialization in China, Chinese Literature, Japan, Korea, or South Asia.
Honours Program in Asian Studies

Graduate
Master of Arts in Asian Studies
Doctor of Philosophy in Asian Studies

Course Offerings
The Department of Asian Studies offers two categories of undergraduate courses. The first category features courses on the contemporary and historical culture of South, Southeast, and East Asia, and do not require knowledge of an Asian language. The second category features courses in various Asian languages from an introductory to advanced level, with the latter covering literary, philosophical and historical works in their original language.

The department also offers graduate courses falling under the categories of Asia, China, Japan, Korea, South Asia, and Theories, Methods & Pan-Regional.

Languages
Chinese - largest program in North America with over 2,000 annual enrollments offering courses in Mandarin for heritage and non-heritage learners, as well as Cantonese speakers. Courses in Cantonese slated to be available beginning in 2015.
Hindi 
Indonesian
Japanese - largest program of its kind in mainland North America with over 2,000 yearly enrollments.
Korean
Persian
Punjabi
Sanskrit

Research activities

Faculty
 Bruce Fulton, Associate Professor in Korean Literature and Literary Translation

Former Faculty
 William L. Holland
 Edwin G. Pulleyblank

See also
 Institute of Asian Research
 Peter Wall Institute for Advanced Studies
 Canadian Institute for Advanced Research

References

External links
Department of Asian Studies Home Page
Asian Library Home Page
Chinese Language Program - Official Website
Korean Language Program - Official Website
Punjabi & Sikh Studies - Official Website

University of British Columbia